Exploiting Dysfunction is Cephalic Carnage's second full-length album. It was released on April 18, 2000, by Relapse Records.

Track listing

Personnel 
 Lenzig Leal – vocals
 Zac Joe – guitar
 John Merryman – drums
 Steve Goldberg – guitar
 Jawsh Mullen – bass

References 

Cephalic Carnage albums
2000 albums
Relapse Records albums
Albums with cover art by Wes Benscoter